The Wonderful Wizard of Oz is a 2000 musical play based on the 1900 novel of the same title by L. Frank Baum that premiered at the Toronto Civic Light Opera Company.  The lyrics are by James Patrick Doyle and Joe Cascone, the music is by Doyle and the book is by Cascone who also directed.  This company describes the show as the most requested in their repertory, and revived it in 2002, 2010, and again in 2017.

Background
Joe Cascone, artistic director of the Toronto Civic Light Opera Company, had long wanted to stage a musical of The Wonderful Wizard of Oz that was truer to Baum's original intentions, and as such, was able to incorporate various influences from the many adaptations of the story produced throughout the 20th century, including the original 1903 musical, the famous 1939 MGM film, the musical The Wiz and several others.  In writing the libretto for the new musical, Cascone made Baum a character in the play as a narrator, also doubling as the Wizard.  Composer and lyricist James Patrick Doyle was a long time Oz admirer who restored some of the music from Baum's The Maid of Arran, the 1902 Wizard, The Woggle-Bug, The Tik-Tok Man of Oz, Prince Silverwings, and The Patchwork Girl of Oz, which had not been heard in recent decades.  The production premiered in 2000 at the Toronto Civic Light Opera Company, directed by Cascone with choreography by Lesley Ansell.  Two original cast albums were released.  One by Hungry Tiger Music in 2000, and one by The Civic Light Opera Company in 2002, featuring the revised score.

The Toronto Civic Light Opera revived the show in 2002 and again in 2010.  Joe Cascone and David Haines, of the original and revival casts (as, respectively, Baum/Wizard and the Cowardly Lion), presented highlights of this musical as well as of many other Oz musical incarnations at the International Wizard of Oz Club's Winkie Convention at Asilomar Conference Center in Pacific Grove, California, on July 9, 2011 as part of a concert entitled "Songs in the Key of Oz" which is also available on CD.

The show is to be presented again from November 29 to December 10, 2017 at the Zion Cultural Centre, Toronto featuring members of the original 2000, 2002 and 2010 casts (including Cascone and Haines) along with several newcomers to the various roles.

Songs
The original cast album was recorded October 27, 2000, at Grace Church Chapel on the Hill, Toronto.

Just a Touch of Humbug (Baum and Co.)
Gray (Dorothy)
'Round and Around (Aunt Em, Uncle Henry, Dorothy & Co.)
Free! (Boq & Munchkins)
The Wizard Who Lives in Oz (Locasta, Munchkins)
Wicked Is What I Do (Wicked Witch & Co.) *
Rags and Hay (Scarecrow)
A Tin Man's Tale (Tin Woodman)
'Fraid Not (Lion)
Dream for Me (Scarecrow, Tin Woodman & Lion) +
Further Along the Way (Four Friends)
Pull Together (Mouse Queen & Co.)
Finale Act I (Four Friends & Co.)
Emerald City (Royal Army & Co.)
Oz, the Great and Terrible (Wizard, Four Friends)
Come Along with Me (Four Friends)
The Golden Cap/Fly! (Wicked Witch, Monkeys)
Nothing Special (Dorothy)
Wicked Waltz of the West (Wicked Witch) *
In the Castle of No Return (Wicked Witch, Winkies) - added to the 2010 production
Reprise—Just a Touch of Humbug (Wizard & Co.)
Even Further Along the Way (Baum, Four Friends & Co.)
Reprise—Dream for Me (Glinda) *
This Land of Oz (Glinda & Co.)

 Cut from subsequent productions
+ Cut from 2017 production
The score was largely re-recorded and released on a second CD in 2002 by The Civic Light Opera Company to reflect many of the musical changes that had been made since the original version had been made in the preceding two years.  This CD is available through http://www.civiclightoperacompany.com/wizard_of_oz.html

Cast of Characters

L. Frank Baum/Wizard 
Dorothy Gale 
Toto 
Aunt Em 
Uncle Henry 
Locasta, Good Witch of the North 
Scarecrow 
Tin Woodman 
Lion 
Queen of Field Mice
Wicked Witch of the West 
Winged Monkey King
Hungry Tiger 
Glinda, Good Witch of the South 
and various Farmers, Munchkins, Crows, Kalidahs, Poppies, Field Mice, Emerald City Citizens, Winged Monkeys, Winkies, Hammerheads, Fighting Trees, Quadlings

The role of Dorothy was originally played by Kelly Sanders in 2000 and 2002.  In the 2010 production, Olivia Stupka and Alisa Berindea alternated in the role of Dorothy.  Nicole Burda will assume the role of Dorothy for the 2017 production.  Members of the original casts to reprise their original roles again in 2017 are David Haines as the Cowardly Lion, Joe Cascone as L. Frank Baum/Wizard and Sandi Horwitz as Locasta.

References

External links
Official website for the cast album
Mark Andrew Lawrence reviews the 2010 revival

2000 musicals
Musicals based on novels
Musicals based on The Wizard of Oz